Manuchehr I was the eleventh Shah of Shirvan. He is considered to be first fully Persianized ruler of the dynasty. Starting from his rule, the Shirvanshahs favoured names from the pre-Islamic Iranian past and claimed descent from characters such as the Sasanian monarch Bahram V Gur.

Reign
In 1027, Manuchehr succeeded his father Yazid II as the Shah of Shirvan. Two years later, he declared war against the Hashimids of Derbent. He was, however, defeated by an Hashimid army which ravaged his land. The following year, his kingdom was invaded by a Rus' army under Ingvar the Far-Travelled. Manuchehr tried to repel them from Caucasus, but was soundly defeated at Baku; many prominent men of Shirvan were killed, such as certain Ahmad ibn Khasskin. Manuchehr then had the Araxes river closed in order to stop the Rus'. However, this resulted in the death of a number of Muslims.

Nevertheless, some time later, Manuchehr managed to finally repel the Rus'. In 1032, an combined army from Sarir and Alania invaded Shirvan and seized its capital Shamakhi. Many people were massacred and many riches were seized by them. During their withdrawal from Shirvan, however, they were attacked and defeated by the people of Derbent.

Death
In 1034, Manuchehr was betrayed and stabbed by his younger brother Ali, who had with the help of Manuchehr's wife Sitta entered the latter's house. Ali thus became the new Shirvanshah.

References

Sources 
 

11th-century Iranian people
1034 deaths
Shirvanshahs
11th-century rulers in Asia
History of Derbent